A caruncle is defined as 'a small, fleshy excrescence that is a normal part of an animal's anatomy'. Within this definition, caruncles in birds include wattles (or dewlaps), combs, snoods, and earlobes. The term caruncle is derived from Latin caruncula, the diminutive of carō, "flesh".

Taxonomy
Caruncles are carnosities, often of bright colors such as red, blue, yellow or white.  They can be present on the head, neck, throat, cheeks or around the eyes of some birds. They may be present as combs or crests and other structures near the beak, or, hanging from the throat or neck. Caruncles may be featherless, or, have small scattered feathers.  In some species, they may form pendulous structures of erectile tissue, such as the snood of the domestic turkey.

Caruncles are sometimes secondary sexual characteristics, having a more intense color or even a different color, developing as the male reaches sexual maturity.

Function
Caruncles are also ornamental elements used by males to attract females to breeding. Having large caruncles or colorful bright ones indicates high levels of testosterone, that they are well-fed birds able to elude other predators thus showing the good quality of their genes. It has been proposed that these organs are also associated with genes which encode resistance to disease. It is believed that for birds living in tropical regions, the caruncles also play a role in thermoregulation, making the blood cool faster when flowing through them.

Turkeys
   In turkeys, the term usually refers to small, bulbous, fleshy protuberances found on the head, neck and throat, with larger structures particularly at the bottom of the throat.  The wattle is a flap of skin hanging under the chin connecting the throat and head and the snood is a highly erectile appendage emanating from the forehead.  Both sexes of turkey possess caruncles, although they are more pronounced in the male. Usually they are pale, but when the male becomes excited or during courtship, the caruncles, wattle and snood all engorge with blood, become bright red or blue, and enlarge.

The beard (a tuft of modified brush-like feathers) also becomes erect.

Muscovy ducks
In the context of Muscovy ducks, caruncles refer to the red fleshy mask that surrounds the head of adult birds, particularly prominent in adult drakes (males).

Birds with caruncles
Many species from a variety of families have caruncles, including:

Phasianidae (pheasants, roosters and turkeys)
Cathartidae (condors and vultures)
Falconidae (falcons)
Accipitridae (eagles and vultures)
Casuariidae (cassowaries)
Ciconiidae (storks)
Threskiornithidae (ibises and spoonbills)
Charadriidae (lapwings)
Anatidae (swans, ducks and geese)
Cuculidae (cuckoos and relatives)
Musophagidae (turacos)
Cacatuidae (cockatoos)
Psittacidae (parrots and macaws)
Coliidae (mousebird)
Callaeidae (kokako, saddleback and huia)
Campephagidae (lobotos)
Meliphagidae (honeyeaters)
Picathartes (white-necked rockfowl)
Platysteiridae (black-throated wattle-eye)
Tyrannidae (indian silverbill)

Gallery

References

Bird anatomy
Anatomy